Dean Redman is a British-born Canadian actor.

Career
He is known for his work on War for the Planet of the Apes (2017) and appeared in two roles, playing the characters Varis and Caged Frost Wolf in the live action film, Warcraft (2016). He also appeared in The X Files and Second Chance.

He is also a voice actor, working with some of Vancouver's leading voice studios, including Ocean Studios, Sound Kitchen Studios, KOKO Productions, and New Machine Studios among many others. In his voice acting debut, he lent his voice to the character  Dutch, an ex-marine who leads the Lagoon company in Black Lagoon. He has also been the voice of Nick Fury for many Marvel Productions appearances of the character since 2009.

In his interview in the Behind the Scenes production clip of the Black Lagoon Volume 1 Limited Edition Extras Disc, it is revealed that he is a former commercial pilot.

Filmography 
Ninjago (2020) – Unagami
Super Dinosaur (2019) – General Casey
Warcraft (2016) – Varis/Caged Frost Wolf
Percy Jackson & the Olympians: The Lightning Thief (2010) (uncredited) – Nashville Cop #1
Sanctuary (2009)
 2012 (2009) – Vegas Fireman
Iron Man: Armored Adventures (2009) – Nick Fury
Impact (2009)  – War Room Tech #1
Not Another Damn Musical (2009) – Officer Hudson
Polar Storm (2009) (TV) – Sergeant
The Day the Earth Stood Still (2008) – Military Policeman
Smallville (2007) Policeman, Fire Chief
Trial by Fire (2008) – Norris
The Art of War II: Betrayal (2008) – Team Leader
Good People, Bad Things (2008)  – Danny
 Storm Seekers (2008) (TV) – Cop
Masters of Science Fiction (2007) – Bradley Tanner
The 4400 (2007) – Private Jones
Blood Ties (2007) – Vincent
When a Man Falls in the Forest (2007) – Security Guard
White Noise: The Light (2007) – Security Guard
Noah's Arc (2006)  – Clayton
The Hard Corps (2006) – Drive By Passenger
The Dead Zone (2006) – Vet
Veiled Truth (2006) – Pawn shop clerk
Blade: The Series (2006)  – Armed Familiar
Black Lagoon (2006) – Dutch
Dark Storm (2006) – MP #1
Hollow Man 2 (2006) – Police Guard
Lesser Evil (2006) – Hawthorne
Final Days of Planet Earth (2006) – EMT
Da Vinci's City Hall (2006)  – Police Constable #1
Alone in the Dark (2005) – Agent Richards
Da Vinci's Inquest (2004)  – Eddie
Fatal Lessons: The Good Teacher (2004)  – Policeman
Stealing Christmas (2003)  – Store Guard
Jake 2.0 (2003) – Guard
Stargate SG-1 (2003) – Lt. Woeste
The Black Prayer (2002) – Black

References

External links
 
 Dean Redman at the CrystalAcids Anime Voice Actor Database
 

Year of birth missing (living people)
Living people
Canadian male film actors
Canadian male voice actors
Black Canadian male actors
Canadian people of Jamaican descent
Place of birth missing (living people)
Commercial aviators